The tehsil of Gujar Khan, an administrative subdivision of Rawalpindi District in Punjab province, Pakistan, is administratively subdivided into 33 Union Councils - these are:

Tanween
Bewal
Bhadana
Changa Bangial
Daultala
Devi, Punjab
Gujar Khan-I
Jatli
Kuri Dolal
Mandrah
Missa Keswal
Mankiala Branmma
Matwa
Mohra Noori
Kauntrila
Narali
Punjgran Kalan
Qazian
Raman
Islampura
Sahang
Sui Cheemian
Sukho
Gulyana
jhungal جھونگل
Manghot
Krumb ilyas

References

Pakistan-related lists